Isallavi (also: Isayavi or Isallawi) is a village in the Bolivian Oruro Department. It is the birthplace of Evo Morales, Bolivia's former President.

Isallavi has 33 inhabitants (2012) and is situated in the Orinoca Canton, a district of Andamarca Municipality in Sud Carangas Province.

References

External links
 Map of Uncia region 1:250.000 (JPEG; 8,22 MB)
 Andamarca Municipality – General map No. 41201
 Andamarca Municipality – Detailed map and population data (PDF; 455 kB) (Spanish)
 Oruro Department – Municipality social data (PDF; 5,86 MB) (Spanish)

Populated places in Oruro Department